Idia majoralis, the greater idia, is a litter moth of the family Erebidae. The species was first described by J. B. Smith in 1895. It is found in Canada from Ontario and Quebec, south into the United States, where it has been recorded from Illinois, Wisconsin and Missouri.

References

"Idia majoralis". Moths of Maryland. Archived September 28, 2011.

Herminiinae
Moths of North America
Moths described in 1895